Military education and training in China is a fundamental form of higher learning covering defence education as required by The Military Service Law of the People's Republic of China and The Decisions of the Central Committee of the Communist Party about Education System Reform.

History

Military training traces back to the feudal era in China. According to the Book of Rites and Zhou, the Western Zhou Dynasty had two levels of studies: guoxue and xiangxue. The University in the Western Zhou Dynasty focused on martial arts and teachers were military officers. The major content of military training was learning archery and driving chariots. This is the earliest known instance of military training. Later dynasties continued the practice. During the Qing Dynasty the Baoding Military Academy was set up for training officers in modern industrial-era warfighting techniques.

During the Kuomintang reign, the Whampoa Military Academy was organized for officer training and boy scouts training also existed.

In July 1955, the first military service law was issued, which first required high school students and undergraduates to take military training. That winter, pilot projects were conducted at Beijing Sport University and Beijing Iron and Steel Engineering Institute, which were followed by twelve other higher education institutes. More than 10,000 students were trained. From 1955 to 1957, the Ministry of Education and Ministry of National Defence authorized 127 schools to carry out military training. The number of trained students reached over 70,000. At that time, higher education institutes focused more on training technical reserve officers, while high schools paid more attention to basic military training.
 
In the early 1960s first grade students in 38 institutes of higher learning and 70 senior high schools and trade schools from 53 cities experimented with military training with the authority of the State Council.

After the Third Plenary Session of the 11th CPC Central Committee, the government expanded military training given political stability and a growing economy. As of 2012, almost 500 universities and colleges and 3000 middle schools provided military training.

The People's Liberation Army administers several institutions for military education. These include the Academy of Military Science, National Defence University, National University of Defense Technology, 301 Hospital, 307 Hospital, and the Army Command College.

Purpose
To promote the spirit of patriotism and improve the idea of defence
To develop good will and characters
To shape collectivism
To promote the Communist Party of China
To reinforce the ideology of Socialism with Chinese Characteristics
To benefit later learning

Student training

According to the Law of the People's Republic of China on National Defense Education, pupils, middle school students and undergraduates should have military training when term opens or after National Day.

Until high school, students practise basic formation and movement.

High school students drill and study emergency evacuation, as well as national defence.

Undergraduates take formal military training and emergency evacuation.

Drill and formation
Formation training (队形训练) includes stand at attention (立正), stand at ease (稍息), footwork (步法), salute (敬礼) and review.

References

External links
 Official Website